was an Edo-period giant seated statue of Shaka Nyorai in what is now Ueno Park, Tokyo, Japan. Of bronze and dating to 1631, it was restored after earthquake damage in 1640, a fire in 1841, and again after the 1855 Edo earthquake. Heavily damaged during the 1923 Great Kantō earthquake, when the head was toppled, much of its bulk was melted down for reuse during the Pacific War. In 1972 the face, stored in Kan'ei-ji, was put on display in its former location.

See also
 Daibutsu
 Japanese sculpture
 List of National Treasures of Japan (sculptures)
 Conservation Techniques for Cultural Properties

References

Colossal Buddha statues in Japan
Bronze Buddha statues
Japanese sculpture
1631 works
Ueno Park